Golubovac may refer to:

 Golubovac (Paraćin), a village in Serbia
 Golubovac (Trstenik), a village in Serbia